The National Waterway 1 (NW-1) or Ganga-Bhagirathi-Hooghly river system is located in India and runs from Prayagraj in Uttar Pradesh to Haldia in West Bengal via Patna and Bhagalpur in Bihar across the Ganges river. It is of prime importance amongst all the national waterways considering its locational advantages. The NW-1 passes through West Bengal, Jharkhand,  Bihar and Uttar Pradesh and serves major cities and their industrial hinterlands like;

 Haldia
 Howrah
 Kolkata
 Saran
 Bhagalpur
 Munger
 Patna
 Ghazipur
 Varanasi
 Prayagraj

It was declared as a waterway in October 1986. It is navigable by mechanical boat up to Patna.

Development 
The topography of NW-1 falls within the flat terrain of the Indo-Gangetic plain. The land is predominantly agricultural with some of the  major cities of India lying in this region. For thousands of years, river Ganga and its tributaries and distributaries have been used for navigation and to transport people and local produce from these agricultural lands.

On 12 August 2016 Nitin Gadkari, the Union Minister for Shipping, Road Transport and Highways laid the foundation stone of the waterway terminal at Varanasi, Uttar Pradesh. He flagged off the trial run of two vessels which carried newly manufactured cars of Maruti Suzuki from Varanasi to Haldia, West Bengal.

On 12 November 2018 Prime Minister Narendra Modi inaugurated multi-modal terminal at Varanasi.

The  route of NW-1 will be upgraded to maintain the following least available depth to allow for higher tonnage vessels of 1,500-2,000 tonnage to ply on the route.

Major challenges 
One of the major changes to the development of NW-1 is braiding and meandering characteristics of river Ganga and the large fluctuation of the water volume during the summer and monsoon months. The major challenges are:

 Braiding and meandering characteristics of river
 Fluctuation of water velocity — from  during flood season to  during dry seasons
 High silt load - Ganges carries around 1,600 million tonnes of silt annually
 Shoal and island formation leading to splitting of main channel
 Changes to navigation line due to the lateral migration of the river
 Existence of power line pylons at various locations
 Existence of pontoon bridges are a significant threat to navigation — about 7 pontoon bridges are present between Buxar and Prayagraj which are in use

Route

Traffic 
Even today the stretch of the river assigned as NW-1 is being used to transport cargo — mostly local produce and tourists. The Ministry of Shipping projects that the NW-1 will carry mostly bulk goods. Cargo like cement, iron ore, coal and coal combustion products, crude oil and petroleum products, rock phosphate, timber, stone chips, manganese ore and agricultural produce Finished iron products from the number of steel plants present in this region will also be a major cargo in this route.

Controversy 
The initial proposal is based on a study by Danish Hydrological Institute, which prepared reports on two stretches between Prayagraj and Varanasi and between Varanasi and Buxar. The announcement was made after World Bank agreed to fund the initial 50 million including technical support without any public consultation. The move was criticized by river activists and professors of Banaras Hindu University.

Involvement of World Bank
A representation was sent by several experts on the environmental and social impact of reviving the NW-1 to Government of India and World Bank in August, 2014. The representation was led by economist Dr. Bharat Jhunjhunwala along with a group of environmentalists and former bureaucrats. The representation was followed by meetings with World Bank. The World Bank representatives were briefed about the ecological and social implications of the proposal. The adverse impact on river bank communities, the unmitigated displacement of people due to erosion at Farakka, a cost-benefit analysis for all stakeholders involved and whether taxation of the waterway will render it unviable. The World Bank clarified that they were unaware of the plan to construct 16 barrages and no funds had been disbursed till then. However  However, as per a letter dated 18 June 2014  forwarded by Shipping Minister Mr. Nitin Gadkari to the Finance Minister, Mr. Arun Jaitley, a proposal for financial assistance to four navigational barrages was made.

Opposition from Chief Minister of Bihar
The Government of Bihar led by Chief Minister Nitish Kumar opposed the initiative to construct barrage on Ganga stating that construction of barrages will convert Ganga into big ponds. He stated that not a single drop of pure water from Ganga reaches Bihar due to similar barrages in upstream of the river. Later, the Inland Waterways Authority of India (IWAI) has clarified that there are at present no plans to construct any new barrage on the  stretch of the NW-1 on the Ganga.

Dredging of Ganga
Environmentalist Debadityo Sinha claimed that World Bank has possibly scrapped the plan for construction of barrages for the National Waterway-1 after public opposition from Uttar Pradesh and Bihar. However, significant maintenance dredging of the river Ganga will be undertaken by the government of India to make it navigable. The author also alleged that the Ministry of Environment, Government of India has made an amendment in law in January, 2016 in which dredging activities for maintenance is exempted from the requirement of Environmental Clearance.

Threat to Gangetic Dolphin and aquatic fauna
Wildlife Biologist Nachicket Kelkar claimed that the noise and disturbance caused by intensive dredging activities is known to have deleterious impacts on aquatic biodiversity, especially the National Aquatic Animal of India, the Ganges River Dolphin which is basically founded in Bhagalpur region of Bihar. In particular, substrate-breeding fish species are negatively affected by dredging and might even become locally extinct following failed breeding. As a bulk of fisheries depends on benthic (bottom-dwelling) fishes in most of India’s larger rivers, this will mean important threat to the sustainable production of fish in these systems as well.

Destruction of Self-Purification of Ganga
A study done by NEERI, a government of India funded research institution shows that the river Ganga is unique in its sediment content that is more radioactive compared to any other river and lake water sediments. These sediments release Copper and Chromium and have bactericidal properties that multiply coliphages reducing and ultimately eliminating coliforms from water. River activist and economist Dr. Bharat Jhunjhunwala has claimed that the dredging activities undertaken will destroy the self-purification capacity unique to the Ganga.

See also
 Inland Waterways Authority of India
 Amritsar Delhi Kolkata Industrial Corridor

References

Further reading

External links
 Official Website
 CIWTC

Transport in Haldia
Transport in Allahabad district
Waterways in India
Transport in Uttar Pradesh
Canals in Uttar Pradesh
Transport in Bihar
Transport in West Bengal
Canals opened in 1986